Pilditch Stadium is a multi-use stadium in the show grounds complex of Pretoria city, situated at the Northern part of the Gauteng province in South Africa. It is used for track and field athletics and football matches, and is currently used as home venue by the two Vodacom League teams: Supersport United (2nd team) and Garankuwa United.

Sports venues in Pretoria
Soccer venues in South Africa
Buildings and structures in Pretoria
Multi-purpose stadiums in South Africa
Athletics (track and field) venues in South Africa
Garankuwa United F.C.